Nototriche jamesonii is a species of flowering plant in the family Malvaceae. It is found only in Ecuador. Its natural habitat is subtropical or tropical high-altitude grassland.

References

Malveae
Endemic flora of Ecuador
Least concern plants
Taxonomy articles created by Polbot